This is a list of Slovenian statistical regions by Human Development Index as of 2021.

References 

Slovenia
Human Development Index
Counties By Human Development Index
HDI